Nicole Farhi, Lady Hare, CBE (born 25 July 1946) is a former French fashion designer, now sculptor born in Nice, France.

Life 
Born in France Farhi is the daughter of Sephardic Jews from Turkey Her father sold rugs and lighting. She attended synagogue with her grandparents Members of her family endured concentration camps during the Second World War

Career
Farhi studied fashion in the late 1960s in Paris and started her career as a freelancer there 1967 before moving to London in the 1970s.

In 1978, Farhi was employed by Stephen Marks on his French Connection label, to head up the company's design studio in Bow, East London. She enjoyed considerable freedom to design the way she wished

She is also known for designing costumes for theatre and cinema

She is a member of the Royal Society of Sculptors

In 1982, Marks assisted Farhi in launching an eponymous Nicole Farhi higher-end fashion label within the French Connection group. The label opened shops worldwide, as well as in London and New York in 1999.

The success of her first label was followed by Nicole Farhi for Men in 1989 and Nicole Farhi Home Collection was launched in 1998 and a concept store named 202 in 2002 featuring homeware, clothing lines and 'all day' bras.

On 15 March 2010, French Connection announced the sale of the brand and retail chains to OpenGate Capital for up to £5 million. Entering administration in 2013, the labels had six stores, sold wholesale to major stores like John Lewis and numerous concessions in other department stores. Administrators Zolfo Cooper were appointed on 3 July 2013, to advise on sale or restructuring of the UK shops and associated retail outlets located within Harvey Nichols, House of Fraser and Selfridges.

During her fashion career Farhi would work one day a week and weekends in her sculpture studio. After many years of juggling the two she became a full-time sculptor.  She turned her back on fashion and focussed on sculpture, with a solo exhibition in 2019

Speaking before her show at the 2019 Edinburgh Festival she reflected on the difference between working as part of a team in fashion and alone as a sculptor.  'I enjoyed the pace of fashion where every six months you start again. I liked that challenge.' [But]  'I love to face my own thoughts all day long and not having anybody to talk to'.

Her Edinburgh Art Festival exhibition contained 25 clay busts of her favourite 20th-century literary figures, including Oscar Wilde, Françoise Sagan, Muriel Spark and Joan Didion, all under 20 centimetres high.

Personal life
Farhi and Marks' professional relationship resulted in a personal relationship, and the couple had a daughter, Candice Marks, before separating. Farhi married British playwright David Hare in 1992 They met when she designed the costumes for his play Murmuring Judges.  Eduardo Paolozzi, her friend and mentor was her witness at their wedding.

She is a cousin of the writer and human rights campaigner Moris Farhi.

In February 2007, Farhi was a signatory to the declaration of the Independent Jewish Voices, a new Jewish network, calling for an open and critical debate on Israel and criticising certain Jewish organisations' unconditional support of Israel.

Honors and awards
In 2007, Farhi was appointed an honorary CBE, for services the British fashion industry and in 2010, she was awarded the Legion of Honour.

References

External links
 
 
 

1946 births
Living people
People from Nice
20th-century French Sephardi Jews
French fashion designers
French women fashion designers
Jewish fashion designers
20th-century French sculptors
French women sculptors
21st-century sculptors
French emigrants to the United Kingdom
20th-century French women artists
21st-century French women artists
1982 establishments in France
Honorary Commanders of the Order of the British Empire
20th-century British Sephardi Jews
British fashion designers
British sculptors
British women sculptors
British women fashion designers
Wives of knights